This is a list of films produced in Albania during the 2020s.

Films
 I Love Tropoja (2020)
 My lake (2020)
 Three Lions Heading to Venice (2020)
 Police per koke (2022)

References

2020s